Otro Nivel De Música is the first studio album released by reggaeton artist J Álvarez on September 20, 2011 through Universal Music Latino.

Track listing

Remixes

Otro Nivel De Musica Reloaded 
On May 1, 2012 a special edition named Otro Nivel De Musica Reloaded was released. It added 15 new tracks and was produced by DJ Nelson.

This special edition was nominated for the Latin Grammy Award for Best Urban Music Album.

Track listing

Charts

References

2011 albums
J Alvarez albums
Universal Music Latino albums